Anularya is a genus of large operculate freshwater snails, aquatic gastropod mollusks in the family Viviparidae.

Distribution

The extant species of this genus appear to be endemic to Fuxian Lake, Xingyun Lake, Qilu Lake, Datun Lake and Changqiao Lake in Yunnan Province in the China.

Species
There are 2 extant species of Anularya, previously assigned to Margarya:

  Anularya mansuyi (Dautzenberg & Fischer, 1905) - type species
 Anularya bicostata (Tchang & Tsi, 1949)

References

External links
 
 

Viviparidae